School of the Arts (SOTA) is a progressive alternative public middle school and high school in Rochester, New York. Administered by the Rochester City School District, SOTA is located on the corner of Prince Street and University Avenue, within walking distance of the Memorial Art Gallery, Eastman Theatre, Writers & Books, Visual Studies Workshop, and other cultural organizations.

History
The School of the Arts was founded in 1980 as an experimental program at Wilson Jr. High School.  In 1981, the school transferred to Monroe High School as was known as the School of the Arts at Monroe.  Only grades 7-9 were represented that year.  The school stayed at Monroe for many years, eventually becoming a full Jr-Sr. High School, while retaining the name "School of the Arts at Monroe." It eventually moved into its current space (the old Eastman School of Music dormitories at 45 Prince St.), when it became "The School of the Arts".

Academics
As in other schools, School Of The Arts has academic classes and arts classes. SOTA offers Honors and Advanced Placement(AP) classes, Special Education, Spanish 1,2,3 and 4-Honors. Students carry a full academic course load as well as a fine arts sequence. SOTA offers a rich diversity of arts courses within seven major fine arts concentrations:
Creative Writing
Dance
Drama
Instrumental (Strings, Wind, Brass, and Percussion)
Piano
Theatre Technology
Visual Arts
Vocal

Film and television
SOTA was featured in the major motion picture Cherry Crush, where they used the lunch room, theatres, hallways and classroom as the "public school" setting for the main characters Jordan Wells played by Jonathan Tucker and Shay Bettencourt played by Nikki Reed.
On June 4, 2009, SOTA received the Signature Schools Enterprise Award. They were one out of six schools that won the award, which comes with a $5,000 grant. During this award ceremony, students held a silent protest against planned budget cuts affecting the arts by standing in the lobby with their mouths covered with black duct tape.
On June 9, 2009, SOTA students held another protest against the budget plan proposed by former Superintendent Brizard that slashed teaching positions. The students marched from school to RCSD headquarters and back to City Hall, where they performed things including tap dance, poetry reading, Jazz band, and choir outside of the entrance.

Performances
SOTA puts on two musicals and three plays a year, as well as an annual Dance Concert, music recitals, poetry readings/coffee houses, and other various art performances. The school has also begun celebrating Black History Month with a whole day full of performances dedicated to it.

Notable alumni
Taye Diggs, actor
Charlene L. Keys, singer
Peter Shukoff, comedian, musician, and Internet personality
Iris Zimmermann Olympic fencer
Felicia Zimmermann, Olympic fencer
Timothy Mitchum, actor

References

External links
School of the Arts (Rochester NY) homepage
 School of the Arts website
School of the Arts PTSA Newsletter

Alternative schools in the United States
High schools in Monroe County, New York
Schools in Monroe County, New York
Public high schools in New York (state)
Public middle schools in New York (state)